John Brecken (died March 6, 1827) was an English-born United Empire Loyalist, merchant and political figure. He was a member of the Legislative Assembly of Prince Edward Island from 1785 to 1787.

He came to Charlottetown from Shelburne, Nova Scotia in 1784 with his wife, Ann Wake, and established a business there. He returned to England some time before 1826 and died there in 1827.

His son Ralph and his grandson John Brecken also served in the colony's assembly.

References 
 Old Protestant Burying Grounds biographies
 Genealogy at Island Register Accessed August 13, 2019.

Year of birth missing
1827 deaths
People from Shelburne County, Nova Scotia
English emigrants to pre-Confederation Prince Edward Island
Members of the Legislative Assembly of Prince Edward Island
Colony of Prince Edward Island people